Kinross is a city in Keokuk County, Iowa, United States. The population was 80 at the time of the 2020 census.  The community is named after Kinross in Scotland.

History 
Kinross was created by people moving to be close to a new railroad depot in 1879 by moving both houses and businesses. This move, along with other departures, effectively turned their prior community, Hinkletown, Iowa, into a ghost town.

Geography
Kinross is located at  (41.459422, -91.987387), southwest of Iowa City.

Demographics

2010 census
At the 2010 census, there were 73 people, 32 households and 19 families living in the city. The racial make-up was 100.0% White.

There were 32 households, of which 28.1% had children under the age of 18 living with them, 46.9% were married couples living together, 9.4% had a female householder with no husband present, 3.1% had a male householder with no wife present, and 40.6% were non-families. 37.5% of all households were made up of individuals, and 12.5% had someone living alone who was 65 years of age or older. The average household size was 2.28 and the average family size was 3.11.

The median age was 44.5 years. 24.7% of residents were under the age of 18; 9.5% were between the ages of 18 and 24; 16.4% were from 25 to 44; 41.1% were from 45 to 64; and 8.2% were 65 years of age or older. The gender make-up was 53.4% male and 46.6% female.

2000 census
At the 2000 census. there were 80 people, 31 households and 18 families living in the city. The racial make-up was 100.00% White.

There were 31 households, of which 32.3% had children under the age of 18 living with them, 54.8% were married couples living together, 3.2% had a female householder with no husband present, and 41.9% were non-families. 29.0% of all households were made up of individuals, and 6.5% had someone living alone who was 65 years of age or older. The average household size was 2.58 and the average family size was 3.33.

32.5% were under the age of 18, 6.3% from 18 to 24, 31.3% from 25 to 44, 21.3% from 45 to 64, and 8.8% who were 65 years of age or older. The median age was 36 years. For every 100 females, there were 110.5 males. For every 100 females age 18 and over, there were 92.9 males.

The median household income was $31,563 and the median family income as $33,750. Males had a median income of $20,833 and females $18,750. The per capita income was $12,625. 14.3% of families and 11.7% of the population were living below the poverty line, including no under eighteens and none of those over 64.

Education
Kinross is within the English Valleys Community School District.

References

External links
 The rise and fall of Hinkletown

Cities in Iowa
Cities in Keokuk County, Iowa
Populated places established in 1879
1879 establishments in Iowa